Derrick Burckley Etienne Jr. (born 25 November 1996) is a professional footballer who plays as a winger for Major League Soccer club Atlanta United FC. Born in the United States, he represents the Haiti national team.

Born in Richmond, Virginia, and raised in Paterson, New Jersey, Etienne is the son of former Haitian International and Long Island Rough Riders forward Derrick Etienne and the older brother of Haitian International midfielder Danielle Etienne.

Early career

High school
Etienne was born in Virginia (where his father Derrick Sr. played for the Richmond Kickers) before moving to Paterson, New Jersey where he spent his childhood. He attended high school at Passaic County Technical Institute in Wayne, New Jersey, playing varsity soccer for the Bulldogs in his freshman year with 6 goals and 9 assists. He helped lead the team to the state Vo-Tech tournament and the Big North Conference Liberty division titles. Etienne ended his high school playing career to focus on the Red Bulls Academy following the season.

College career
Etienne spent his youth club career with the New York Red Bulls Academy. Etienne joined the academy in 2009 at the U-14 level at age 12. While being one of the youngest players on the team, Etienne progressed and stood out at the U14, U15, U16, and U18 levels before signing a letter of intent to play college soccer at the University of Virginia. Despite appearing for NYRB II, Etienne was able to maintain his college eligibility and on 29 August 2015, he made his collegiate debut for the Cavaliers in a 1–0 victory over UNC Charlotte. On 21 September 2015, Etienne scored his first collegiate goal in a 1–0 victory over his father's alma mater, VCU. Later that same year, Etienne chose not to complete his degree at Virginia, and signed a pro contract.

Professional

New York Red Bulls
On 28 March 2015, Etienne made his professional debut for USL affiliate club New York Red Bulls II in a 0–0 draw against the Rochester Rhinos. On 24 May 2015 Etienne scored his first professional goal and assisted on another, helping New York to a 3–2 victory over FC Montreal. For this performance Etienne was named to the USL team of the Week. On 30 May 2015 Etienne scored his second professional goal for New York in a 4–2 loss to his father's former club, Richmond Kickers. On 20 June 2015 Etienne scored for New York in a 2–0 victory over Louisville City FC.

On 21 December 2015, Etienne signed a Homegrown Contract with the New York Red Bulls, forgoing his remaining NCAA eligibility. Etienne was loaned back to Red Bulls II in 2016 for their home opener on 26 March. On 10 April 2016 Etienne scored his first goal of the season, helping New York Red Bulls II to a 4–0 victory over Bethlehem Steel FC. On 7 May 2016 Etienne scored his second goal of the season in 3–1 victory over Pittsburgh Riverhounds. On 23 October 2016 Etienne opened the scoring for New York and also recorded an assist in a 5–1 victory over Swope Park Rangers in the 2016 USL Cup Final.

On 28 May 2017, Etienne scored his first goal of the season for New York Red Bulls II, scoring the game winner on a free kick in a 2–1 victory over Charleston Battery. On 19 July 2017, Etienne recorded his first assist for the first team finding Daniel Royer as he scored New York's fourth goal of the day in a 5–1 victory over San Jose Earthquakes.

On 31 March 2018 Etienne scored his first goal for the New York Red Bulls in a 4–3 loss to Orlando City SC. On 5 May 2018, Etienne scored the last goal for New York in a 4–0 derby victory over New York City FC. The following week, on 12 May Etienne scored New York's second goal in a 2–1 victory over Colorado Rapids. On 28 October 2018, Etienne scored the game-winning goal as the Red Bulls clinched their third Supporters Shield in a 1–0 win over Orlando City SC.

On 8 August 2019, Etienne was loaned to MLS side FC Cincinnati for the remainder of the 2019 season, where he scored zero goals in five appearances.

Etienne was released by New York at the end of their 2019 season.

Columbus Crew
Following his release from New York Red Bulls, Etienne moved to Columbus Crew on 4 February 2020. He scored the second goal in the Crew’s 3-0 victory over Seattle Sounders FC in MLS Cup 2020, which saw the club win their second league championship.  On 26 October 2022, Columbus Crew released Etienne, making him a free agent.

Atlanta United FC
On 30 November 2022, Atlanta United FC announced that they signed Etienne to a contract through 2025, with options for 2026 and 2027.

International career
Though born and raised in the United States, Etienne chose to represent Haiti in international competition, becoming the third member of his family to do so after his father and uncle. He was a member of the Haiti Under-17 team that competed in the 2013 CONCACAF U-17 Championship in Panama as well as the Haiti Under-20 team that competed in the 2015 CONCACAF U-20 Championship in Jamaica.

On 9 November 2016, he made his first senior team appearance for Haiti, coming on as a substitute in a 5–2 loss to French Guiana in the third round of 2017 Caribbean Cup qualification. He scored his first international goal on 8 January 2017 against Trinidad and Tobago in the 2017 Caribbean Cup qualification fifth place playoff.

In the summer of 2019, Etienne competed in the 2019 CONCACAF Gold Cup helping Haiti win Group B after defeating Bermuda, Nicaragua, and Costa Rica to advance to the knockout stage. After upsetting Canada 3-2 in the quarter final match, Haiti advanced to the semifinals of the Gold Cup for the first time in national team history but fell short in a 1-0 loss to Mexico after extra time.

Career statistics

Club

International

International goals
Scores and results list Haiti's goal tally first.

Honors
New York Red Bulls II
USL Cup: 2016

New York Red Bulls
Supporters' Shield: 2018

Columbus Crew
MLS Cup: 2020
Campeones Cup: 2021

Filmography

Television

References

External links
 USSF Development Academy bio
 Virginia Cavaliers bio
 

1996 births
Living people
Citizens of Haiti through descent
Haitian footballers
Association football midfielders
Haiti youth international footballers
Haiti international footballers
American soccer players
American sportspeople of Haitian descent
Virginia Cavaliers men's soccer players
New York Red Bulls II players
New York Red Bulls players
FC Cincinnati players
Columbus Crew players
Atlanta United FC players
Sportspeople from Paterson, New Jersey
Soccer players from New Jersey
Soccer players from Richmond, Virginia
USL Championship players
Major League Soccer players
Homegrown Players (MLS)
2015 CONCACAF U-20 Championship players
2019 CONCACAF Gold Cup players
2021 CONCACAF Gold Cup players